Zhou Ji, may refer to:

 Zhou Ji (Tang dynasty), Chinese warlord of the late Tang dynasty (618–907)
 Zhou Ji (born 1946), Chinese mechanical engineer and politician, academician of the Chinese Academy of Engineering (elected 1999)
 Zhou Ji (born 1962), Chinese engineer and professor at Tsinghua University,academician of the Chinese Academy of Engineering (elected 2017)